Watson Peak at  above sea level is a peak in the White Cloud Mountains of Idaho. Bear Lake is in the basin northwest of the peak.

References 

Mountains of Custer County, Idaho
Mountains of Idaho
Sawtooth National Forest